Oedaspis multifasciata is a species of tephritid or fruit flies in the genus Oedaspis of the family Tephritidae.

Distribution
France, Germany, Spain, Austria, Italy, Ukraine.

References

Tephritinae
Insects described in 1862
Diptera of Europe